Winson Engineering was a British manufacturer of narrow gauge and miniature railway steam locomotives and rolling stock during the 1990s. It built several new locomotives for heritage railways as well as undertaking major rebuilds of existing locomotives.

History 

Winson was founded in the mid-1980s, although it was not incorporated until 21 March 1990. The engineering works were initially at the harbour in Porthmadog. In 1988, the company moved to Penrhyndeudraeth. In 1995 the company moved again to Daventry. In June 2001 the company went into receivership and subsequently closed.

Significant Projects

Rebuilds 
 Rebuild of Welsh Highland Railway Bagnall Gelert
 Preparation of Ffestiniog Railway Fairlie 0-4-4-0T Livingston Thompson for display in the National Railway Museum

New locomotives 

 Winson 7 Bure Valley Railway 2-6-4T Wroxham Broad, built 1992 
 Winson 12 Bure Valley Railway ZB Class 2-6-2 Blickling Hall  gauge, built 1994 
 Winson 14 Bure Valley Railway ZB Class 2-6-2 Spitfire  gauge, built 1994 
 Winson 15 2-6-2T Camila  gauge, built 1995 for Ferrocarril Austral Fueguino, Ushuaia, Tierra del Fuego.
 Winson 16 Bure Valley Railway ZB Class 2-6-2 Thunder  gauge, built 1996/7 
 Winson 17 Corris Railway 0-4-2ST No.7  gauge, built 1999-2004 - work completed at Drayton Designs.
 Winson 19 2-6-2T "Abt_ Kun" gauge, built 1998 for  Tetsudou_Bunka_Mura Japanese Theme Park (Matsuida city).
 Winson 20 Bure Valley Railway ZB Class 2-6-4 Mark Timothy  gauge, built 1999 

At the time of liquidation the company was building a replica of the Manning Wardle locomotive Yeo for the Lynton & Barnstaple Railway. The frames are currently (2010) in storage awaiting further work. Winson 7 Wroxham Broad was actually a major rebuild of a diesel loco (Tracy Jo) originally built in 1964 by G & S Light Engineering of Stourbridge.

Winson 20 Mark Timothy rebuild by Alan Keef Ltd in 2003.

New rolling stock 

 Six carriages for the Welsh Highland Railway
 Four carriages built in 1996 for the Dresden Parkeisenbahn

References 
 

Locomotive manufacturers of the United Kingdom